The Hans Wilsdorf Bridge (French: Pont Hans-Wilsdorf) is a bridge in Geneva, Switzerland.

History 
In 1962, a temporary bridge was built by the military across the Arve which would later be replaced by the Hans Wilsdorf Bridge. Construction began in 2009 and was completed in 2012. The bridge opened on 30 August 2012.

See also 
 Peace Bridge (Calgary)
 List of bridges

References 

Bridges in Switzerland
Transport in Geneva